Vlasta Děkanová (September 5, 1909 – October 16, 1974), a Czechoslovak artistic gymnast, was the first World all-around champion in women's artistic gymnastics.

Early life 

Děkanová was born in Prague in 1909.  Her father was a dedicated member of Sokol and the manager of a gym in the Žižkov district of Prague.

She progressed through the Sokol system, graduating in 1933.  She performed locally at the Lucerna Palace.  Beginning in 1928, Děkanová started touring and performing in exhibitions internationally in countries including Belgium, France, Netherlands, Poland, and Yugoslavia.  In the United States, she performed in exhibitions in Cleveland, New York, and Washington.

Competitive career 

Děkanová made her World Championship competitive debut at the very first 1934 World Artistic Gymnastics Championships for women held June 11 and 12 that year in Budapest, Hungary.  Reportedly, cheating in the scoring was uncovered and corrected, allowing the Czechoslovakian team, of which she was a part, to win the team title.  There was no individual competition.  But when all of the individual totals were added up, Děkanová had the highest overall total.

With the reputation Děkanová built there, she and the Czechoslovakian women's team went into the 1936 Berlin Summer Olympics as the favorites, but ended up placing 2nd to the home-advantaged German team.  Consistently near the top in scoring in both the compulsory and optional segments in both the vault and uneven bar parts of the competition, she was the top non-German competitor (4th, overall, out of 64) given those two events combined:  on vault she placed 3rd in compulsories, 9th in optionals, and 6th overall; on bars she placed 7th in compulsories, 5th in optionals, and 8th overall.  But somewhat less highly-awarded performances, within the overall context, for her exercises in both segments of the beam part of the competition, (18th in compulsories, 33rd in optionals, 23rd overall), meant that she ended up finishing 6th in the individual standings.  These relatively lower scores on beam kept her from finishing much higher, almost assuredly within the top 3, if not on the very top, in the individual standings.  The approximate score difference between 1) what her beam scores would have been if they were more in-line with her placements within the other two apparatuses (vault and bars) in the competition and 2) what they actually were, would have ended up being at least 1/3 of the score gap between her Czechoslovakian team's 2nd place finish and the German team's first-place finish.

Two years later, Děkanová competed at the next installment of the 1938 World Artistic Gymnastics Championships where she again was the highest individual finisher among all competitors, successfully defending her placement at the previous World Championships.

According to an official document published by the FIG, Dekanova "won the general competition at the 1934 and 1938 World Championships."

Another supporting piece of information suggesting Děkanová's consistent excellence is that at a Czechoslovakian selection competition held on May 15, 1938, just weeks before the 1938 Worlds held on June 30 and July 1, Děkanová placed 1st among all 19 individuals.

World War II Activities and Post-Competitive Career 

Like many other Sokol members (gymnasts or otherwise) such as 1922 World All-Around Champion František Pecháček, 1928 Olympic Parallel Bars Champion Ladislav Vácha, and 1938 World All-Around Champion Jan Gajdoš, all also Czechoslovakian, and all of whom lost their lives as resistance fighters during World War II, Děkanová was also involved in the underground Czechoslovakian resistance in World War II.  She was a magistrate and was involved in copying and distributing material from illegal publications, such as "V boj" ("Into combat") by prominent journalist Irena Bernášková.  She was punished for such activities, once spending several weeks in jail.  She also served as a volunteer nurse during the Prague uprising of May 1945 and helped remove wounded soldiers from the front line of combat.

After World War II, she remained active in the sport and trained young gymnasts.  She was also involved in developing and maintaining city infrastructure as a planner and dispatcher of road and water management buildings.

Legacy 

Before the introduction of the women's full program at the 1952 Helsinki Olympics, medals were awarded to women's teams only, without distinguishing individual athletes.  Therefore, Děkanová was the most decorated female artistic gymnast at the World and Olympic level, overall, in the era before World War II, taking into account what information is publicly available.

Additionally, as Děkanová led her team to its first two World Championship victories and coached her team to Olympic victory in 1948, she can be credited as playing a very crucial role in establishing the legacy of her country in the sport of women's gymnastics.  At the 15 World and Olympic competitions held, from 1934 to 1970, they won team medals at all but 2 of those competitions, and one of their only two non-medal-wins was due to not attending, therefore, they won team medals at 13 out of their 14 showings at those various championships throughout that era.

References

External links
 profile

1909 births
1974 deaths
Czechoslovak female artistic gymnasts
Olympic gymnasts of Czechoslovakia
Gymnasts at the 1936 Summer Olympics
Olympic silver medalists for Czechoslovakia
Olympic medalists in gymnastics
Medalists at the 1936 Summer Olympics
Medalists at the World Artistic Gymnastics Championships
Gymnasts from Prague